County Fair is a 1937 American drama film directed by Howard Bretherton and starring John Arledge, Mary Lawrence and J. Farrell MacDonald. It was a remake of the 1932 film The County Fair.

Cast
 John Arledge as John Hope 
 Mary Lawrence as Julie Williams 
 J. Farrell MacDonald as Calvin Williams, Julie's Father 
 Fuzzy Knight as Whitey the Trainer 
 Jimmy Butler as Buddy Williams, Julie's Brother 
 Harry Worth as Turner the Gambler 
 Matty Roubert as Snipe, Turner's Jockey 
 William Hunter as Dutch, Turner Henchman 
 Henry Hall as Commissioner 
 Edwin Mordant as Mr. Brooks, Moon Glow's Owner

References

Bibliography
 Langman, Larry & Ebner, David. Hollywood's Image of the South: A Century of Southern Films. Greenwood Publishing, 2001.

External links

1937 films
1930s sports drama films
American sports drama films
American black-and-white films
1930s English-language films
Films directed by Howard Bretherton
Monogram Pictures films
American horse racing films
1937 drama films
1930s American films